Isonychia sicca is a species of brushlegged mayfly in the family Isonychiidae. It is found in Central America, North America. In North America its range includes southeastern Canada, and all of Mexico.

References

Mayflies
Articles created by Qbugbot
Insects described in 1862